Pausanias of Orestis was a member of Philip II of Macedon's personal bodyguard (somatophylakes). He assassinated Philip in 336 BC, possibly at the behest of Philip's wife Olympias, or even his son Alexander the Great. Pausanias was killed while fleeing the assassination.

Motive as an assassin
The most popular explanation of the murder comes from Diodorus Siculus, who expanded on its mention by Aristotle. According to Diodorus, the general Attalus blamed Pausanias of Orestis for the death of his friend, who confusingly was also named Pausanias. 

Pausanias of Orestis, feeling spurned, insulted his romantic rival Pausanias, Attalus's lover, in public. To secure his public honor, Pausanias, the beloved of Attalus, endangered himself in battle while protecting the king. Devastated by his lover's effective suicide, Attalus sought to punish Pausanias of Orestis by getting him drunk and raping him. For any number of reasons, Philip did not punish Attalus for the rape of Philip's former lover; probably as a consolation, Pausanias of Orestis was promoted to the rank of somatophylax.

It has been supposed then that Pausanias' motive for killing Philip was at least in part due to personal anger over Philip, who was the host of the party where Pausanias was raped, not having intervened in any way, nor even having reprimanded Attalus.

Problems with timing of the revenge
However, there is a problem with the delay between the rape and the revenge: Diodorus supports the attribution of a personal motive to Pausanias, but dates the events that led to the assault on Pausanias to the time of the Illyrian Pleurias, but the last known campaign Philip conducted against the Illyria took place in 344 BC. The correspondence between these dates would put eight years between Pausanias' rape and the murder of Philip – a long wait for an ostensibly hot-blooded act of personal revenge.

Killed while fleeing and trial of co-conspirators
Pausanias killed Philip at the wedding ceremony of Philip's daughter Cleopatra to Alexander I of Epirus; however, in the aftermath of the murder, whilst fleeing to the city gate in order to make his escape, Pausanias tripped on a vine root and was speared to death by several of Philip's bodyguards, including Attalus, son of Andromenes the Stymphaean, Leonnatus, and Perdiccas, who were also bodyguards and friends of Alexander.

The murder was certainly premeditated, as horses were found near where Pausanias had tried to flee. At the murder trial, two other men, Heromenes and Arrhabaeus, were found guilty of conspiring with Pausanias, and executed. Leonnatus, who threw the spear that killed Pausanias, was demoted, possibly under the suspicion that he was trying to prevent the assassin from being interrogated.

Memorial
Philip's son and successor, Alexander, had Pausanias's corpse crucified. However, as soon as the new king had left Macedon, a memorial to Pausanias was erected by Olympias, Philip's widow and Alexander's mother.

See also
Amyntas (son of Antiochus)

References

Sources

Ancient
Plutarch: Life of Alexander
"Philip's Assassination", Plutarch
Diodorus Siculus, 16.94

Modern
"Death of Philip: Murder or Assassination?"
Alexander The Great, J. R. Hamilton
Alexander Of Macedon 356-323 B.C., Peter Green

4th-century BC births
336 BC deaths
Generals of Philip II of Macedon
Greek LGBT people
Ancient LGBT people
Somatophylakes
People associated with Alexander the Great
Ancient Macedonian generals
People executed for murder
Greek regicides
Ancient Orestians
People executed by Alexander the Great
Year of birth unknown
Ancient murderers